was a Japanese gay erotic artist. Kimura, along with George Takeuchi and Sadao Hasegawa, is noted by artist and historian Gengoroh Tagame as a central figure in the second wave of contemporary gay artists that emerged in Japan in the 1970s.

Biography
Kimura was born in 1947. He began his career in gay erotic art in 1978 as illustrator and cover artist for Barazoku, the first commercially published gay magazine in Japan; he would be a regular contributor before departing the magazine in 1989. He would contribute artwork to other gay magazines throughout his career, notably , G-men, and SM-Z. Kimura would also contribute artwork to the early yaoi magazines June and Allan, making him among the first gay artists to achieve crossover success with a female audience in yaoi publications. He was a co-founding member of Studio Kaiz, along with Naoki Tatsuya and his partner Kihira Kai.

Kimura's artwork was ubiquitous in gay publications in Japan in the 1970s and 1980s, with Gengoroh Tagame describing Kimura as the "face" of gay magazines in Japan. His works typically depict handsome, masculine men rendered in a homoerotic style that is frequently romantic and sensual, rather than explicitly pornographic. Artist Kazuhide Ichikawa has described Kimura's illustrations as "soft" and "nostalgic", while Tagame describes his art as featuring "sporty young men who look familiar, and not beautiful men who appear disconnected from reality."

On February 18, 2003, Kimura died at the age of 56 from a pulmonary embolism. A tribute edition of Tan Pan Body, a collection of his works self-published in 1997, was published shortly after his death. His collected works are held by Studio Kaiz.

Collected works
 1997 – Tan-Pan Body (画集), self-published
 1998 – Go-One Boy (作品集), self-published

References

External links
Ben Kimura at Studio Kaiz (via Archive)

1947 births
2003 deaths
20th-century Japanese painters
Japanese gay artists
Japanese erotic artists
20th-century Japanese LGBT people
21st-century Japanese LGBT people
Gay male erotica artists